The 1977 Northern Arizona Lumberjacks football team was an American football team that represented Northern Arizona University (NAU) as a member of the Big Sky Conference (Big Sky) during the 1977 NCAA Division II football season. In their third year under head coach Joe Salem, the Lumberjacks compiled a 9–3 record (5–1 against conference opponents), outscored opponents by a total of 324 to 204, and finished second out of seven teams in the Big Sky.

The team played its season and home opener on September 3 at Lumberjack Stadium before moving to the newly-constructed NAU Ensphere, later renamed the Walkup Skydome, in Flagstaff, Arizona. The first game in the new stadium was played on September 17 against Montana.

The Lumberjacks earned a berth in the 1977 NCAA Division II Playoffs, losing in the first round to Jacksonville State.

Schedule

References

Northern Arizona
Northern Arizona Lumberjacks football seasons
Northern Arizona Lumberjacks football